The Obamba are an ethnic group located largely in Gabon's Haut-Ogooué Province and the  Republic of Congo. The Obamba people's traditional language is Mbama or Mbete, which is often also referred to as Obamba.

References

Ethnic groups in Gabon